Paghman Hill Castle, also known as Paghman Palace, is located in the town of Paghman in Afghanistan, next to the city of Kabul. The site opened to the public in 2014 and is visited by many tourists, especially during major festivals. The castle and surrounding areas are sometimes used as a location to host foreign guests.

History

Construction 
The preparation process began in March 2013. 700 people were employed for the project. According to officials, a total of $6.5 million was allocated from the budget of the Ministry of Finance for preparing the palace. The development effort had a huge impact on the economy of local communities. The construction work on the palace and its surroundings incurred more than US$15 million. Experts believed the international functions in Paghman can make the place a preferred tourist destination in Afghanistan. 

The Nowruz celebrations in 2014 were later cancelled due to security reasons and all the celebrations took place at the Arg, Kabul. The government's official reason for the move was that work on the castle was incomplete.

Description
The officials say that the castle has three floors and is made of Afghanistan's marble stone and wood from Kunar Province. Its interior is decorated with handmade carpets and includes security cameras and emergency rooms. Beside the palace, there is a venue for exhibitions of domestic products. The palace's surroundings also consists of thousands of newly planted trees as well as a Buzkashi field, a waterfall and other attractions. The palace's interior is decorated with traditional handmade Afghan carpets and other traditional material. The boulevard that leads to the palace has trees on both sides.

See also 
 List of castles in Afghanistan
 Tourism in Afghanistan

References

External links
, Nov. 25, 2022 (a special inside tour)

Palaces in Afghanistan
Buildings and structures in Kabul
2014 establishments in Afghanistan
Buildings and structures completed in 2014